Daniel Mahrer (born 6 January 1962) is a Swiss former alpine skier. In 1991, he won the Bronze medal in Downhill skiing at the World Championship in Saalbach.

Career
He competed at the 1988, 1992 and the 1994 Winter Olympics.

World cup victories

References

External links
 
 

1962 births
Living people
Swiss male alpine skiers
Olympic alpine skiers of Switzerland
Alpine skiers at the 1988 Winter Olympics
Alpine skiers at the 1992 Winter Olympics
Alpine skiers at the 1994 Winter Olympics
20th-century Swiss people